Mutoko District is a district of Mashonaland East Province, Zimbabwe, in southern Africa. In 1992, the district had a population of 124,013. At that time, nearly 50% of the population was under 15 years of age.

Infrastructure
The settlement at Mutoko was designated as a "growth point" in the initial planning of the new Zimbabwe government in the early 1980s. It has electricity, a hospital, a post office, and banking facilities.  In addition there is grain storage run by the Grain Marketing Board, and storage for cotton run by the Cotton Company of Zimbabwe.

There is a main road that runs northeast-southwest from Murehwa District with connections to Harare through the district to Mudzi District and thereafter to Mozambique.

There are no permanent streams in the district and most water is from boreholes. Some stream beds are dammed and catch seasonal run-off.

Economy
The primary occupation is agriculture, with the majority being subsistence farmers.  In 1998, about 12% of the land in the district was small commercial farms.  The primary crop is maize, followed by ground nuts (peanuts), and table vegetables. Maize, ground nuts, sunflowers (for seed), sorghum, and millet are grown commercially.

Notes

External links
 

 
Districts of Mashonaland East Province